The Dyckman Basketball Tournament is one of the premier summer streetball tournaments in New York City. It is located in Monsignor Kett Playground a.k.a. Dyckman Park in the Washington Heights/Inwood section of Manhattan. What was a one division, six-team tournament in its first season in 1990 is currently a tournament with six age divisions, containing a total of 77 teams. Its college/pro division is the most notable of them all, on any given night you are liable to see NBA, NCAA, and overseas professionals on the court.

History 

The tournament was formed by Kenneth Stevens, Omar Booth, and Michael Jenkins in an effort to provide a positive outlet for the community. Inwood, like many other neighborhoods in inner cities during the late 1980s was plagued by the crack epidemic. The community was infested with drugs, crime and interracial turf wars between the emerging Dominican population and the existing black population in the area. During this time Monsignor Kett Playground was in horrible conditions and free of basketball and any related activities. The park that was once known for being a Holcombe Rucker site during the 1970s was now an eyesore for the community and area residents. Stevens, Booth, and Jenkins painted the court and restored the park to conditions apt to host a tournament.  The three believed creating a basketball tournament would spark positive relations through sport, community and goodwill, thus changing the culture in the community and furthering the effort to better the community. In its first season the tournament hosted a six-team, twelve-man roster playing in a five-game regular season leading to the playoffs. The tournament continued to progress every year with help from local businesses who sponsored the tournament. On its tenth anniversary it landed its first corporate sponsor in Converse (shoe company). From there on they have received sponsorships from numerous corporate companies in addition to their local supporters. Their biggest sponsors have been Nike, Inc., who has been affiliated since 2004. In 2011 Nike formed a team in the tournament with the top street ballers in NYC and named them “Team Nike.”    Coached by the legendary Maxwell "Bingo" Cole, they won the championship.

Divisions 

 College-Pro Division: 19 Teams
 High School Division: 16 Teams
 Junior Division: 16 Teams
 Biddy Division: 14 Teams
 Pee Wee Division: 6 Teams
 Super Pee Wee Division: 6 Teams

Regular season/Playoffs (College/Pro Division) 

 7 regular season games
 2 Conferences
 Teams are seeded 1-8 on both sides
 Playoffs are one game elimination

Past champions (College/Pro Division) 

 1990 - Dyckman
 1991 - Dyckman
 1992 - Dyckman
 1993 - Head Bangers
 1994 - Regulators
 1995 - Head Bangers
 1996 - Big Tyme
 1997 – N/A
 1998 –N/A
 1999 - Da Fundamentalz
 2000 -The Wall
 2001 - The Wall
 2002 - Team and 1
 2003 - Takes No Prisoners
 2004 - Takes No Prisoners
 2005 - 84th St.
 2006 - Takes No Prisoners
 2007 - Dominican Power
 2008 - Bingo's All-Stars
 2009 - Bingo's All-Stars
 2010 - Takes No Prisoners
 2011 - Team Nike 
 2012 – Team 914
 2013 - BodySnatchers
2018 - TMT/Showstoppers

Notable players 

 Rick Apodaca
 Ron Artest
 Sean Banks
 Michael Beasley
 Corey Brewer
 Trey Burker
 Keydren Clark
 Baron Davis
 Adris De León
 DeMar DeRozan
Markelle Fultz
 Kevin Durant
 Jerome Dyson
 Gary Ervin
 Tyreke Evans
 Corey Fisher
 Luis Flores
 Gary Forbes
 Sundiata Gaines
 Francisco García
 Ricardo Greer
 Dwight Hardy
 Jeremy Hazell
 JJ Hickson
 Brandon Jennings
 Felipe López
 Anthony Morrow
 Allan Ray
 Kareem Reid
 Terry Rozier
 Kenny Satterfield
 Iman Shumpert
 Chris Smith
 J. R. Smith
 Edgar Sosa
 Curtis Stinson
 Curtis Sumpter
 Tyshawn Taylor
 Charlie Villanueva
 Kemba Walker
 Corey Williams
 Curtis Dennis 
 Jarrid Famous
 Kyrie Irving

References 

The Dyckman Basketball Tournament is also featured in the 2003 Billboard Magazine Sports & Recreation TOP 10 DVD-"STREETBALL CLASSICS. VOL. 1

Basketball competitions in the United States